Luduș  (Hungarian: Marosludas or Ludas; Hungarian pronunciation: , German: Ludasch) is a town in Transylvania, Romania in Mureș County, 44 km south-west from the county's capital Târgu Mureș.

Six villages are administered by the town: Avrămești (Eckentelep), Cioarga (Csorga), Ciurgău (Csorgó), Fundătura (Mezőalbisitelep or Belsőtelep), Gheja (Marosgezse) and Roșiori (Andrássytelep).

History
 1330 – First mentioned as Plehanus de Ludas.
 1377 – Mentioned in a transaction between two Hungarian nobles.
 1930 – 5,085 inhabitants.
 1940 to 1944, Hungarians occupied the town. The Jewish population is murdered during the Luduș massacre from 5 to 13 September 1944. 
 1960 - Luduș became a town.
 1966 - 11,794 inhabitants.
 2002 - 17,497 inhabitants.

Demographics
In 2011, it had a population of 15,328; out of them, 65.9% were Romanian, 23.2% were Hungarian, and 6.3% were Roma.

In 1850, the town had 1,166 inhabitants.
Ethnic composition of the town according to the 1850 census:
Romanians: 1,065 (91.34%)
Hungarians: 34 (2.92%)
In 1910, the town had 4632 inhabitants.
Ethnic composition of the town according to the 1910 census:
Hungarians:3,116 (67.27%)
Romanians:1,385 (29.9%)

Demographic movement of the population according to the census data:

Notable people
 

Dănuț Borbil (born 1973), professional Romanian arm-wrestler
Andreo Cseh (1895–1979), Hungarian/Dutch Roman Catholic priest
Cornel Gheți (born 1986), Romanian footballer
Ella Kovacs (born 1964), Romanian middle-distance runner
Sergiu Mândrean (born 1978), Romanian footballer
Horațiu Pungea (born 1986), Romanian rugby union player
László Sepsi (born 1987), Romanian footballer
Tara (von Neudorf) (born 1974), Romanian artist

See also
 List of Hungarian exonyms (Mureș County)

Notes

External links

  Luduş online
  Datasheet of Ludus in Transylvanian Hungarian Database
  Bánffy-Castle

Towns in Romania
Populated places in Mureș County
Localities in Transylvania
Monotowns in Romania